Zoltán Papanitz (born 10 November 1966) is a Hungarian sports shooter. He competed at the 1988 Summer Olympics, the 1992 Summer Olympics, and the 1996 Summer Olympics.

References

External links
 

1966 births
Living people
Hungarian male sport shooters
Olympic shooters of Hungary
Shooters at the 1988 Summer Olympics
Shooters at the 1992 Summer Olympics
Shooters at the 1996 Summer Olympics
People from Salgótarján
Sportspeople from Nógrád County
20th-century Hungarian people